1521 in the Philippines details events of note that happened in the Philippines in the year 1521.

Events

March
 March 16 – Ferdinand Magellan reaches the Philippines.

April
 April 7 – Ferdinand Magellan arrives at Cebu.
 April 14 – Rajah Humabon and his queen Hara Humamay are christened Carlos and Juana respectively.
 April 27 – Battle of Mactan: Ferdinand Magellan is killed by Lapulapu in the Philippines.

See also
Years in the Philippines
Timeline of Philippine History

References

 
Philippines
History of the Philippines
Years in the Philippines